Gregory Hascard DD (died 15 November 1708) was a Canon of Windsor from 1671 to 1684 and then Dean of Windsor from 1684 until 1708, but he was also a noted pluralist. He 
wrote three books on religious subjects.

Life
Born in Grantham, the son of Thomas Hascard and Alice Hand, Hascard married Rachel Fane on 4 February 1667, at Gray's Inn Chapel, Middlesex (now London WC1).

He was buried in St Giles's Church, Stoke Poges, where a monument was erected in his memory.

Career
Hascard was educated at Emmanuel College, Cambridge, where he was awarded a BA in 1661, an MA in 1664, and a DD in 1671. Thereafter he held clerical appointments in plurality, as Rector of St Michael Queenhithe (1669–1671), Rector of Brickhill Bow, Buckinghamshire (1669–1671), Prebendary of Salisbury (1671–1708), Chaplain to the King (1677–1708), Rector of St Clement Danes (1678–1708), Rector of Bishops Stoke, and Rector of Great Haseley (1697–1708). He was appointed to the third stall in St George's Chapel, Windsor Castle in 1671, a position he held until 1684, when he was appointed Dean of Windsor.

Publications
Hascard was the author of three published religious works:
A discourse about the charge of novelty upon the reformed Church of England: made by the papists asking of us the question, where was our religion before Luther? (London : Printed for Robert Horn, and Fincham Gardiner, 1683.)
A sermon preached before the ... lord mayor ... at the parish-church of St. Botolph, Aldgate (London : Walter Kettilby, 1685)	
A short examination of a discourse concerning edification, by Dr. Hascard, in a letter (London : A. Baldwin, 1700)

Notes

1708 deaths
Canons of Windsor
Deans of Windsor
Alumni of Emmanuel College, Cambridge
Year of birth missing